The 2019 OFC Youth Development Tournament  was the 1st edition of the OFC Youth Development Tournament, an international youth football championship organised by the Oceania Football Confederation (OFC). The tournament was held in Vanuatu between 15 and 24 August 2019.

Teams
A total of six men's under-18 national teams, including four from Oceania and two from outside Oceania (one from Asia and one from Europe), were invited to participate in the cross-confederation event.
 (from UEFA)
 (from AFC)

 (hosts)

Venues
The tournament was played at the Korman Stadium in Port Vila, Vanuatu

Squads

Players born on or after 1 January 2001 were eligible to compete in the tournament. Each team can name a maximum of 20 players.

Group stage
The teams were divided into two groups of three teams, including two from OFC and one from outside OFC.

Times listed are UTC+11:00.

Group A

Group B

Placement matches

Fifth place match

Third place match

Final

Goalscorers

References

External links
OFC’s Youth Development Tournament 2019 – Men’s
News > OFC Youth Development Tournament 2019, oceaniafootball.com

2019–20 in OFC football
2019–20 in Vanuatuan football
2019 OFC Youth Development Tournament
August 2019 sports events in Oceania
2019 in youth association football